Secrets in a Weird World is the fifth full-length album by the German heavy metal band Rage. It was released in 1989. The album was remastered by Noise/Sanctuary in 2002 with slightly altered cover art, and five bonus tracks.

Track listing

Personnel 
Band members
Peter "Peavy" Wagner – vocals, bass
Manni Schmidt – guitars
Chris Ephthimiadis – drums

Additional musicians
Gary Marlowe – keyboards

Production
Armin Sabol – producer, arrangements, mixing
Will Reid-Dick – engineer, mixing
Rage – arrangements
Karl-Ulrich Walterbach – executive producer

References 

Rage (German band) albums
1989 albums
Noise Records albums